Synhomelix annulicornis is a species of beetle in the family Cerambycidae. It was described by Chevrolat in 1855, originally under the genus Pachystola. It has a wide distribution in Africa.

References

Pachystolini
Beetles described in 1855